The 2006 Conference USA baseball tournament was the 2006 postseason college baseball championship of the NCAA Division I Conference USA, held at Reckling Park in Houston, Texas, from May 24–May 28, 2006.  Rice won the tournament in its first year as a member of the conference, and received Conference USA's automatic bid to the 2006 NCAA Division I baseball tournament.  The tournament consisted of eight teams, with two double-elimination brackets, and a single-game final.

Regular season results

Records listed are conference play only. SMU, Tulsa, and UTEP did not field baseball teams.  UCF did not qualify for tournament play.

Bracket

 Bold indicates the winner of the game.
 Italics indicate that the team was eliminated from the tournament.

Finish order

All-tournament team

References

Tournament
Conference USA Baseball Tournament
Conference USA baseball tournament
Conference USA baseball tournament
Conference USA baseball tournament
Baseball competitions in Houston
College sports tournaments in Texas